Maharaja Jambu Lochan was a Kshatriya  King who belonged to Sialkot Sangala after whom the Indian city of Jammu is believed to have been named. According to historical texts, he is the earliest known King of Jammu. He had another brother named Bahu Lochan. The fort of Bahu present in Jammu on the side of Tawi river was attributed to him. Jamboo lochan once was on hunting and then he found a lion and a goat was drinking  water from same spot at same time ,that spot was the Bank of Tawi river also known as Surya putri Tawi, he then concluded this place divine and built a fort there which today is known as Bahu fort there is also a garden facing the divine river Tawi and also a Divine temple inside the fort known as " Bawe wali mata " temple.

References

Indian monarchs